Walter Iván Alexis Montoya (born 21 July 1993) is an Argentine professional footballer who plays as a right winger or midfielder for Rosario Central.

Club career

Rosario Central
Born in Machagai, Montoya joined Rosario Central's youth categories in 2010, after spells at AA Jorge Bernardo Griffa and CSyD Unión Machagai. After progressing through the club's youth setup, he made his first team debut on 4 September 2014 by coming on as a late substitute for Fernando Barrientos in a 1–1 Copa Sudamericana home draw against Boca Juniors.

Montoya made his Primera División debut on 12 October 2014, starting in a 2–1 away loss against the same opponent. He scored his first professional goal the following 23 August, netting the first in a 3–1 home win against Belgrano.

On 12 May 2016, Montoya scored the game's only in a home success over Atlético Nacional, for the year's Copa Libertadores.

Sevilla
On 27 January 2017, Montoya signed a four-and-a-half-year contract with La Liga club Sevilla FC. He made his debut for the club on 2 March, replacing Luciano Vietto in a 1–0 home win against Athletic Bilbao.

Cruz Azul
On December 27, 2017 Montoya was signed from Spanish side Sevilla FC to Mexican club Cruz Azul. Walter Montoya was announced to be the new player of Grêmio of the Brazilian Série A

Honours
Grêmio
 Recopa Gaúcha: 2019
 Campeonato Gaúcho: 2019

Cruz Azul
 Liga MX: Guardianes 2021
 Copa MX: Apertura 2018
 Campeón de Campeones: 2021

Individual
 CONCACAF Champions League Team of the Tournament: 2021

References

External links

1993 births
Living people
Argentine footballers
Association football midfielders
Argentine Primera División players
La Liga players
Liga MX players
Campeonato Brasileiro Série A players
Rosario Central footballers
Sevilla FC players
Cruz Azul footballers
Grêmio Foot-Ball Porto Alegrense players
Racing Club de Avellaneda footballers
Argentine expatriate footballers
Argentine expatriate sportspeople in Spain
Argentine expatriate sportspeople in Mexico
Expatriate footballers in Spain
Expatriate footballers in Mexico
Sportspeople from Chaco Province
People from Machagai